Demet Evgar (born 18 May 1980) is a Turkish actress and singer known for her roles in feature films and TV series. She also pursues an active career as an actress in theatre where she had made her debut. She has founded theatre institutions such as "Pangar", "Hata Yapım Atölyesi", "Müşterek", "Multi Arts Production".

Evgar was born in Manisa in 1980. Her paternal family is of Albanian origin. While Ottoman Empire was collapsing, other part of her family is of Turkish descent who immigrated from Thessaloniki, today part of Greece. Her brother is director Yiğit Evgar.

Her film career has awards and box office successes. In her television career, she starred in the rom-com 1 Kadın 1 Erkek for 8 seasons. She also played supporting roles in the hit comedy series Emret Komutanım, Yedi Numara, and Tatlı Hayat. She played the role of "Kara Fatma" (guest star) in the period series Vatanım Sensin and had a leading role in drama series Avlu and Alev Alev. In 2020, she released her first official single "Nanay" and in 2021 she was featured on Can Bonomo's song "Rüyamda Buluttum".

Filmography

Theatre

Discography

Singles 
 "Farketmeden" (2013)
 "Mak Mek Mok" (2014)
 "Bu Şarkıyı Dinliyorsan" (with Multitap) (2019)
 "Nanay" (2020)
 "Rüyamda Buluttum" (with Can Bonomo) (2021)

References

External links

 
 Diziler.com – Biography of Demet Evgar 

1980 births
People from Manisa
Living people
20th-century Turkish actresses
21st-century Turkish actresses
Turkish stage actresses
Turkish film actresses
Turkish television actresses
Turkish people of Albanian descent